James Hadden may refer to:

 James Cuthbert Hadden (1861–1914), Scottish author, journalist, biographer and organist
 James Murray Hadden (1757–1817), British Army officer